Operation Alberich was the code name of a German military operation in France during the First World War. Two salients had been formed during the Battle of the Somme in 1916 between Arras and Saint-Quentin and from Saint-Quentin to Noyon.  was planned as a strategic withdrawal to new positions on the shorter and more easily defended Hindenburg Line. General Erich Ludendorff was reluctant to order the withdrawal and hesitated until the last moment.

The retirement took place between 9 February and 20 March 1917, after months of preparation. The retirement to the chord of the Bapaume and Noyon salients shortened the Western Front, providing 13 to 14 extra divisions for the German strategic reserve being assembled to defend the Aisne front against the Franco-British Nivelle Offensive, preparations for which were barely concealed.

Background

Winter 1916–1917

An offensive was considered as an alternative, if enough reserves could be assembled in the New Year and a staff study suggested that seventeen divisions might be made available but that this was far too few to have decisive effect in the west. Alternatives, such as a shorter withdrawal, were also canvassed but the lack of manpower made the decision to retire unavoidable, since even with reinforcements from the Eastern Front, the German army in the west  numbered only 154 divisions against 190 Allied divisions, many of which were larger.

German debates
German army thinking about a withdrawal to the  changed during the winter of 1916–1917 and comprised positive and negative reasons. At first it was seen by OHL as a last resort, if pressure on the Somme front became overwhelming. After the Central Powers' success in the Battle of Bucharest (28 November – 6 December 1916) and the beginning of the winter lull in France, optimism at OHL that the retreat was unnecessary rose but was then deflated by the French attack at Verdun on 15 December. During January 1917 the resumption of unrestricted U-boat warfare on 1 February 1917 offered the possibility of driving Britain out of the war. To win in the west, the German armies would have only to avoid defeat; a retirement to the  would give the  a big defensive advantage.

A move back to the  would generate reserves by shortening the front and the defensive strength of the new positions, built in depth, on reverse positions, behind wide belts of barbed wire and studded with machine-gun nests, would allow divisions to hold a wider frontage. The Germans planned to waste the land; villages demolished, bridges blown, roads and railways dug up, wells tainted and the population carried off. The British and French armies would have to repeat the preparations for another offensive, after the retirement made preparations to resume the offensive on the Somme redundant. Every day's delay of an Entente offensive in France gave more time for the U-boat offensive to work; even if the Franco-British managed to attack, the  expected to defeat the attempt.

 Fritz von Below, commander of the 1st Army, had opposed a withdrawal to avoid a blow to the morale of the men who had fought to defend the Somme front. Subordinate commanders on the Somme doubted the ability of their men to withstand another offensive. The commander of the XIV Reserve Corps,  Georg Fuchs, reported that morale was low and that the defences were in a deplorable state, positions near the Ancre being nothing more than flooded shell holes.

Prelude

Crown Prince Rupprecht
Rupprecht also opposed the intention to turn the ground in the Noyon Salient into a wasteland when the final demolitions to scorch the earth began on 16 March, because of the damage to the prestige of the German Empire and the deleterious effects on the discipline of his troops.

Operations on the Ancre

From 11 January to 13 March 1917, the British Fifth Army attacked the German 1st Army positions in the Ancre river valley, on the northern flank of the Somme battlefield of 1916. The Action of Miraumont (17–18 February), Capture of the Thilloys (25 February – 2 March) and the Capture of Irles (10 March) took place before the main German withdrawal began. British attacks had taken place against exhausted German troops holding poor defensive positions left over from the fighting in 1916; some German troops had low morale and showed an unusual willingness to surrender. British attacks in the action of Miraumont and anticipation of further attacks led Rupprecht on 18 March to order a withdrawal.

The retirement caused some surprise to the British, despite the interception of wireless messages from 20 to 21 February. A second German withdrawal took place on 11 March, during a preparatory British bombardment and was not noticed by the British until the night of  Patrols found  empty between Bapaume and Achiet le Petit and strongly held on either flank. German withdrawals on the Ancre spread south, beginning with a retirement from the salient around St Pierre Vaast Wood.



German withdrawal
Alberich began on 9 February 1917 in the area to be abandoned. Railways and roads were dug up, trees were felled, water wells were polluted, towns and villages were demolished and many land mines and other booby traps were planted. About  French civilians in the region were transported to work elsewhere in occupied France, while children, mothers and the elderly were left behind with minimal rations. Robert Nivelle, Commander-in-Chief of the French armies since December 1916, approved only a limited attack to capture the German front position; a potential opportunity to turn the German withdrawal into a rout was lost.

British operations
During the German withdrawal the British Third Army and Fifth Army followed up and conducted the Capture of Bapaume, 1917 (17 March) and the Occupation of Péronne (18 March).

Aftermath

Analysis

Fourteen fewer German divisions were needed for line holding; Allied plans for their spring offensive were seriously disrupted. The operation is considered to have been a propaganda disaster for Germany because of the scorched-earth policy but is also thought to be one of the shrewdest defensive operations of the war. During periods of fine weather in October 1916, British reconnaissance flights had reported new defences being built far behind the Somme front; on 9 November a formation of eight photographic reconnaissance aircraft and eight escorts reported a new line of defences from Bourlon Wood north to Quéant, Bullecourt, the Sensée river, Héninel and the German third line near Arras. Two other lines closer to the front were observed as they were dug ( and ) from Ablainzevelle to the west of Bapaume and Roquigny, with a branch from Achiet-le-Grand to Beugny and Ytres.

In 2004, James Beach wrote that some authorities hold that British aerial reconnaissance failed to detect the construction of the Hindenburg Line or the German preparations for the troop withdrawal. Evidence of German intentions was collected but German deception measures caused unremarkable information to be gleaned from intermittent air reconnaissance. Frequent bad flying weather over the winter and the precedent of new German defences being built behind existing fortifications, during the Somme battle, led British military intelligence to misinterpret the information. In late December 1916, reports from witnesses led the British and French to send air reconnaissance sorties further to the south and in mid-January 1917, British intelligence concluded that a new line was being built from Arras to Laon. By February, the line was known to be near completion and by 25 February, local withdrawals on the British Fifth Army front in the Ancre valley and prisoner interrogation led the British to anticipate a gradual German withdrawal to the new line.

The first intimation of a German withdrawal occurred when British patrols probing German outposts towards Serre, found them unoccupied. The British began a slow follow-up but unreadiness, the decrepitude of the local roads and the German advantage of falling back on prepared lines behind rearguards of machine-gunners, meant that the Germans completed an orderly withdrawal. The new defences were built on a reverse slope with positions behind the defences, from which artillery observers could see the front position, experience having showed that infantry equipped with machine-guns needed a field of fire only a few hundred yards/meters deep. Unfortunately for the Germans, General Ludwig von Lauter and Colonel Kramer from OHL ignored the new thinking and in much of the new position, they put artillery observation posts in the front line or in front of it and the front position was on forward slopes, near crests or at the rear of long reverse slopes.

Notes

Footnotes

References

Books
 
 
 
 
 
 
 
 
 
 

Theses
 

Websites

Further reading
Books

 
 
 
 
 
 
 
 
 

Encyclopaedias

External links

 The German Retreat to the Hindenburg Line
 Operation Alberich, German withdrawal to the Hindenburg Line
 Spears, E. Prelude to Victory (1939) via Internet Archive
 German withdrawal to the Hindenburg Line in Arras sector - history and museum

Military operations of World War I involving Germany
Military operations of World War I involving the United Kingdom
Battles of World War I involving France
1917 in France
Conflicts in 1917
Western Front (World War I)
February 1917 events
March 1917 events